The 2019–20 Akron Zips men's basketball team represented the University of Akron during the 2019–20 NCAA Division I men's basketball season. The Zips, led by third-year head coach John Groce, play their home games at the James A. Rhodes Arena as members of the East Division of the Mid-American Conference.

Previous season
The Zips finished the 2018–19 season 17–16, 8–10 in MAC play to finish in fourth place in the East Division. In the MAC tournament, they defeated Miami (OH) in the first round before losing to Buffalo in the quarterfinals.

Offseason

Departures

Incoming Transfers

2019 recruiting class

Roster

Schedule and results

|-
!colspan=9 style=| Non-conference regular season

|-
!colspan=9 style=| MAC Regular Season
|-

|-
!colspan=9 style=| MAC tournament
|-

|-
Source

References

Akron Zips men's basketball seasons
Akron